Jean Suey Zee Lew (née Lee; July 26, 1924) is a Canadian veteran of World War II who was the only woman of Chinese-Canadian descent to serve in the Royal Canadian Air Force (RCAF). As a member of the RCAF Women's Division, Lee was stationed from 1942 to 1945 at the Royal Canadian Air Force Depot, Eastern Air Command, at Rockcliffe, Ontario.

Lee was born on July 26, 1924, in Cranbrook, British Columbia to Lee Look (Chow Man) and Huey Shee Lee. She had two brothers who also served in the military – Wilson John Lee who served with training command at Fort Macleod, and William, who served in the Korean War. She was awarded her Canadian Citizenship Certificate in a ceremony in February 1947, along with 6 other veterans. She was one of the first women of Chinese descent to become a Canadian citizen. From 1874, Chinese Canadians had been restricted from Canadian citizenship.

References

Bibliography
 

1924 births
Living people
Air force history
Canadian female military personnel
Canadian people of Chinese descent
Canadian women in World War II
People from Cranbrook, British Columbia
Royal Canadian Air Force personnel of World War II
Royal Canadian Air Force airmen
20th-century Canadian women